2019 was the 90th season of competitive baseball in the United Kingdom.

The year saw four teams competing in the top-division National Baseball League, with seven in Triple-A, twelve in Double-A, and 22 in Single-A.

The season began on 7 April 2019 and ended on 18 August, with the National Baseball Championships played on 24 and 25 August.

British Baseball Federation leagues

National Baseball League

The NBL played 52 regular-season matches in total (26 per team).

Triple-A

Double-A

Pool A

Pool B

Single-A

Pool A

Pool B

Central

References

Baseball in the United Kingdom
Baseball
Baseball
British
Baseball competitions in the United Kingdom